The following is the organization of the Union forces engaged in the Red River campaign, during the American Civil War in 1864. Order of battle compiled from the army organization during the campaign. The Confederate order of battle is listed separately.

Abbreviations used

Military rank
 MG = Major General
 BG = Brigadier General
 Col = Colonel
 Ltc = Lieutenant Colonel
 Maj = Major
 Cpt = Captain
 Lt = 1st Lieutenant

Other
 w = wounded
 mw = mortally wounded
 k = killed
 c = captured

Union forces, Battles of Mansfield and Pleasant Hill

Army of the Gulf (Department of the Gulf)
MG Nathaniel P. Banks, Commanding

 Headquarters troops (Companies A and B): Cpt Richard W. Francis
 Escort (Company C): Cpt Frank Sayles

XIII Corps

BG Thomas E. G. Ransom (w April 8)

BG Robert A. Cameron

XIX Corps

MG William B. Franklin (w April 8)

Army of the Tennessee (detachment)
BG Andrew J. Smith

XVI Corps

XVII Corps

Union forces, April 30

Army of the Gulf (Department of the Gulf)
MG Nathaniel P. Banks, Commanding

 Headquarters troops (Companies A and B): Cpt Richard W. Francis
 Escort (Company C): Cpt Frank Sayles

XIII Corps (detachment)
MG John A. McClernand

XIX Corps

MG William B. Franklin (until May 2)
BG William H. Emory

Army of the Tennessee (detachment)
BG Andrew J. Smith

XVI Corps

XVII Corps

Notes

References
 U.S. War Department, The War of the Rebellion: a Compilation of the Official Records of the Union and Confederate Armies. Series 1, Vol. XXXIV, Part 1, Washington, DC: U.S. Government Printing Office, 1880–1901.
 Kiper, Richard Leslie. "Dead-end at the crossroads: the battles of Mansfield (Sabine Crossroads) and Pleasant Hill, Louisiana, 8 and 9 April 1864." (1976) Master’s Thesis, Rice University.

American Civil War orders of battle